The Shrine of Our Lady of the Prairies is a traditionalist Catholic shrine in Powers Lake, North Dakota. It was established in the 1950s by Reverend Fredrick J. Nelson, who also published the "Maryfaithful" magazine. Father Nelson started a grade school and high school in 1961, and built a retirement home also. He founded an order of nuns, the Marian Sisters, headed by Sister Lillian. He had "pilgrimages" during the summer months, drawing thousands of faithful from all over the world to Powers Lake. After Father Nelson's passing, their numbers began to dwindle.

Notes

Traditionalist Catholicism
Buildings and structures in Burke County, North Dakota
Roman Catholic churches in North Dakota
Tourist attractions in Burke County, North Dakota
Roman Catholic shrines in the United States